This is a list of notable hotels in India organized by state. It includes highly rated luxury hotels, skyscraper rated buildings, and historic hotels. It is not a directory of every chain or independent hotel building in India.

Andhra Pradesh

The Bheemli Resort, Bheemli
Taj Tirupati, Tirupati
Radisson Blu Resort, Visakhapatnam

Arunachal Pradesh

Assam

Bihar

Chhattisgarh

Delhi

Ashok Hotel, Delhi
Hyatt Regency Delhi
Imperial Hotel, New Delhi
Maidens Hotel, Delhi

Goa

Grand Hyatt Goa
Planet Hollywood Goa
Ronil Royale
Taj Fort Aguada Resort

Gujarat

Haryana

 Nahar Singh Mahal
 The Oberoi, Gurgaon

Himachal Pradesh

 The Cecil, Shimla
 Peterhoff, Shimla

Jammu and Kashmir

Hari Niwas Palace, Jammu

Jharkhand

Karnataka

Jayamahal Palace Hotel
Lalitha Mahal
Rajendra Vilas
Ritz-Carlton Bangalore
Taj West End Bangalore

Kerala

 Bolgatty Palace
 Mascot Hotel
 The Raviz

Madhya Pradesh

Usha Kiran Palace

Maharashtra

 Four Seasons Hotel Mumbai, Mumbai
 Grand Hyatt Mumbai
 Shalini Palace, Kolhapur
 Taj Mahal Palace and Tower, Mumbai
 Trident Hotel, Nariman Point, Mumbai
 Watson's Hotel, Mumbai

Manipur

Meghalaya

Mizoram

Nagaland

North Goa

Ronil Royale

Odisha

Puducherry

 Hotel de l'Orient, Pondicherry

Punjab

Rajasthan

 Bissau Palace Hotel
 Devigarh, Udaipur
 Diggi Palace. Jaipur
 Hill Fort Kesroli, Alwar
 Lake Palace, Udaipur
 Lalgarh Palace, Bikaner
 Laxmi Niwas Palace, Bikaner
 LMB Hotel, Jaipur
 The Raj Palace, Jaipur
 Rambagh Palace, Jaipur
 Ravla Khempur, Khempur
 Roopangarh Fort, Roopangarh
 Samode Palace, Samode
 Shiv Niwas Palace, Udaipur
 Umaid Bhawan Palace,

Sikkim

Tamil Nadu

 Accord Metropolitan, Chennai
 Crowne Plaza Chennai Adyar Park, Chennai
 The Fernhills Palace, Ooty
 Hilton Chennai
 Hyatt Regency, Chennai
 ITC Grand Chola, Chennai
 Kohinoor Asiana, Chennai
 Le Royal Meridien, Chennai
 The Leela Palace Chennai
 The Park, Chennai
 Park Hyatt, Chennai
 Radisson Blu City Centre, Chennai
 Radisson Blu Hotel, Chennai
 The Raintree Hotel Anna Salai, Chennai
 Raintree Hotel, St Mary's Road, Chennai
 Residency Towers, Chennai
 Savera Hotel, Chennai
 Taj Club House, Chennai
 Taj Connemara, Chennai
 Taj Coromandel, Chennai
 Taj Fisherman's Cove Resort & Spa, Chennai
 Trident, Chennai
 Welcomhotel Chennai
 Welcomhotel Fences Palm Beach, Chennai
 Welcomhotel GST, Chennai
 Westin, Chennai

Telangana

 Park Hyatt, Hyderabad
 Taj Falaknuma Palace, Hyderabad
 Taj Mahal Hotel, Abids

Tripura

Uttar Pradesh

 Fort Madhogarh, Madhogarh

Uttarakhand

 Savoy Hotel, Mussoorie, Dehradun

West Bengal

 Elgin Fairlawn, Kolkata
 The Elgin Hotel, Darjeeling
 Great Eastern Hotel, Kolkata
 Jhargram Palace, Jhargram district
 The Oberoi Grand, Kolkata
 Spence's Hotel, Kolkata
 Windamere Hotel, Darjeeling

See also

 Lists of hotels – an index of hotel list articles on Wikipedia
 Tourism in India

 
 
India